Funeral Suits were an Irish alternative rock band from Dublin.

History
Funeral Suits began in 2007. All of the band members lived in the same area in Dublin, and were introduced to each other either online or through mutual friends. They released numerous EPs before releasing their debut full-length album in 2012 titled Lily of the Valley. Four years later, Funeral Suits released their second and final full-length album titled Islands Apart. In April 2011, Funeral Suits were featured as The Guardian's "New Band of the Week".

Albums

 Lily of the Valley (2012)
 Islands Apart (2016)

Band members
Brian Nolan (bass, vocal) 2008-2010
Mathieu Blanchard (drums) 2008-2010
Brian James (vocal, guitar, synth) 2008-2016
Mik McKeogh (guitar, bass, synth) 2007-2016
Greg McCarthy (drums) 2008-2016
Darragh Grant(bass, synth, guitar)2011-2016

References

Musical groups from Dublin (city)
2008 establishments in Ireland
2016 disestablishments in Ireland
Musical groups established in 2008